Endstead is an historic house in Parktown, Johannesburg, South Africa built  in 1903 by Ernest Willmot Sloper for his own use.

The original property has been sub-divided The only major changes to the house have been the addition of a double garage by Tony Bentel, an enlarged kitchen 1920 by Solomon and Marshall, a garage by Marshall and Fleming that replaced the stables in 1923 and a swimming pool plus pool change rooms.

Description

Enstead was built with local materials: koppie stone and timber shingles. The house has panoramic views across the ridge, and the property was integrated into the ridge landscape with a terraced garden showcasing indigenous shrubs and plants. The  rooms are spacious and well lit by natural daylight.

Timber paneling, doors and fitted furniture inside the house have pegged joints. Many original features of the interior are intact and the terraced garden has been retained as an indigenous garden.

Heritage status
Enstead was nominated as a Heritage site by the Johannesburg Heritage Foundation and was awarded heritage status by Provincial Heritage Resources Authority Gauteng in February 2016.
Endstead is described as having:
 high aesthetic value
 high historical value
 high associative value, being associated with architect Ernest Sloper, and the architectural practice of Baker, Masey & Sloper
 high degree of intactness both to the exterior and interior, which is rare in houses over 100 years old
 fine example of an Arts & Crafts style house from the early 1900s

References

Buildings and structures in Johannesburg